Nindu Dampathulu is a 1971 Indian Telugu-language drama film, produced by M. Jagannatha Rao under the S.V.S. Films banner and directed by K. Viswanath. It stars N. T. Rama Rao, Savitri and Vijaya Nirmala, with music jointly composed by T. V. Raju & Vijaya Krishna Murthy. A few of the scenes in the film are replicated in Swayamkrushi (1987), which was also directed by K. Viswanath.

Plot
The film begins with Ramu (N. T. Rama Rao) a good samaritan, the owner of a pan shop. In spite of being illiterate, he has a high intellect. The people in the colony idolizes him apart from a local goon Gangulu (Satyanarayana).  In front lives a beautiful girl Subbulu, one that endears him. Meanwhile, Ramu rears and civilizes his cousin Vani (Lakshmi), aspiring to marry her. Unaware of this, Vani loves her classmate Ravi (Chandra Mohan), son of a Zamindar Janaki Ramayya (Mikkilineni). Janaki Ramayya has two sons, the elder one Raghu (M. Balaiah) is docile, whereas Ravi is prodigal, due to the pampering of mother Kanaka Durga (Chhaya Devi). Since Raghu is her step-son, she scorns him. Besides, Kodanla Rao (Gummadi) a court clerk aims for his daughter Sridevi (Savitri), an advocate for which he strives and succeeds. Meanwhile, monitoring Ravi's attitude, Janaki Ramayya empowers the entirety to Raghu, which is begrudged by Kanaka Durga. At the same time, Kondala Rao moves to Raghu with the marriage proposal of Sridevi, when Raghu denounces the integrity of the scholarly women. At that moment, enraged Kondala Rao revolts against Raghu. Exploiting it, Kanaka Durga eliminates Raghu through Gangulu. Now Kondala Rao is accused and Sridevi defends him when overwhelmed Kondala Rao passes away. Soon after, Sridevi learns Subbulu is her cousin, so she reaches her, but hides her discipline and behaves ignorantly. After some time, Vani returns, affirms her choice when Ramu sacrifices his love and performs her marriage with Ravi. Later, Ramu couples up with Sridevi and gets her true identity when he makes her a good practitioner. Eventually, a rift arises between Ravi and Vani by arguing, as a result, Vani quits the house. Thereupon, Ramu and Sridevi make her realize the mistake. Simultaneously, a conflict arises between Janaki Ramayya and Ravi too, regarding the property. The same night, Gangulu does a robbery in their house and slaughters Janaki Ramayya, of which Ravi is indicted. At present, Sridevi picks up the case and Ramu digs out the reality. In that process, Subbulu sacrifices her life while guarding Ramu against harm. At last, Ravi is acquitted. Finally, the movie ends on a happy note.

Cast

N. T. Rama Rao as Ramu 
Savitri as Sridevi
Vijaya Nirmala as Subbulu 
Gummadi as Kondala Rao 
Satyanarayana as Gangulu 
Chandra Mohan as Ravi
Allu Ramalingaiah 
Raja Babu as Kishtaiah 
Dhulipala as Priest 
Mikkilineni as Janaki Ramaiah 
M. Balaiah as Raghu
Dr. Sivaramakrishnaiah as Seetaiah 
Chalapathi Rao as Doctor 
Lakshmi as Vani
Chaya Devi as Kanaka Durga 
Rukmini as Rajamma 
Leela Rani as Kamala
Vijaya Bhanu 
Master Visweswara Rao as Maruti

Soundtrack

Music composed by T. V. Raju and Vijaya Krishna Murthy. Lyrics were written by C. Narayana Reddy.

References

1970s Telugu-language films
1970 drama films
1970s buddy drama films
Indian buddy drama films
Films directed by K. Viswanath
Films scored by T. V. Raju